Mountain Ridge High School may refer to:

Mountain Ridge High School (Maryland), Frostburg, Maryland
Mountain Ridge High School (Arizona), Glendale, Arizona
Mountain Ridge High School (Utah), Herriman, Utah